Burim is an Albanian masculine given name, which means riverhead or fountain. The name may refer to:

Burim Kukeli (born 1984), Albanian football player
Burim Myftiu (born 1961), Albanian American photographer

See also
Burim (disambiguation)

References

Albanian masculine given names